Sándor Ambrózy (7 September 1903 – 15 December 1992) was a Hungarian sculptor. His work was part of the sculpture event in the art competition at the 1936 Summer Olympics.

References

1903 births
1992 deaths
20th-century Hungarian sculptors
20th-century Hungarian male artists
Hungarian sculptors
Olympic competitors in art competitions
People from Budapest